Precocious refers to earlier-than-normal development, as in a "precocious child". The term may also refer to:

Films
A Precocious Girl (German title: Csibi, der Fratz aka Früchtchen), a 1934 Austrian comedy film
Precocious Youth (German title: Die Frühreifen), a 1957 West German drama film

Other uses
Precocious (horse), a horse
Precocious puberty, a developmental disorder
Precocious toddler, a legal fiction which assumes that a living person is fertile at birth

See also
Precociality, a developmental strategy in some animals